Monty Black is an Anglican priest.

He was educated at the University of Otago.  He was Archdeacon of Ohariu from December 1996 until February 2013; and is currently Priory Dean of St John, New Zealand.

References

University of Otago alumni
Archdeacons of Ohariu
Living people
Year of birth missing (living people)